Lendava (formerly Dolnja Lendava, in older sources also Dolenja Lendava; , formerly Alsólendva; , formerly Unter-Limbach) is a town in Slovenia in the region of Prekmurje. It is the seat of the Municipality of Lendava. It is close to the border crossing with Hungary at Dolga Vas–Rédics, and Hungarian is one of the official languages of the municipality, along with Slovene.

The town is the centre of the Hungarian minority in Slovenia. It is also known for the monumental theater and Hungarian Community Centre designed by the architect Imre Makovecz.

Name
The town is named after the Ledava River; the original nasal in the name of the river was lost in Slovene, but the n in the name of the town was preserved due to Hungarian influence. The former name of the town, Dolnja Lendava (literally, 'lower Lendava'), contrasted with that of Gornja Lendava (literally 'upper Lendava'). The name of the settlement was changed from Dolnja Lendava to Lendava in 1955.

History

Alsólendva was a district of the Zala comitat in the Kingdom of Hungary until 1918. It was part of Hungary again from 1941 to 1945.

Jewish community

The first census of the population in the beginning of the 18th century mentions two Jewish merchants, and the following censuses showed an increasing Jewish population composed of merchants, innkeepers, distillers, mead producers, lawyers, and physicians. They played an important role in the economy of Lendava, owning a local hotel, a few pubs, and stores. Local Jews also started the first bank in Lendava. A Jewish school opened in 1850 and it was active until 1921. The last rabbi in Lendava was Mor Lowy.

The synagogue in Lendava is one of only two synagogues left in Slovenia.

Geography

Climate 
The meteorological station is a climatic station and is one of 17 of its kind in the country. The station in Lendava is at an altitude of 190 m and is located on a sloping hillside. The surrounding area includes neighbouring houses with outbuildings, vineyards, trees, gardens and meadows. The station has been at this location since January 1962.

Only the coastal regions of Slovenia receive similarly low annual precipitation on average. 

Since records began, Lendava has had a White Christmas on 12 occasions: 1963, 1968, 1969, 1970, 1978, 1981, 1984, 1994, 1996, 1999, 2001 and 2007.

Landmarks

Church

The parish church in the settlement is dedicated to Saint Catherine of Alexandria and belongs to the Roman Catholic Diocese of Murska Sobota. There is also a Lutheran church in the town. It was built in 1931.

Castle
Lendava Castle is a former property of the Esterházy family. The mainly 18th-century building stands on a hill above the town centre and contains a museum and a gallery.

Twin towns – Sister cities

Lendava is twinned with:
 Zalaegerszeg, Hungary

References

External links

Lendava on Geopedia

 
Populated places in the Municipality of Lendava
Hungary–Slovenia border crossings
Spa towns in Slovenia
Cities and towns in Prekmurje